Sailing on the River Thames is practised on both the tidal and non-tidal reaches of the river. The highest club upstream is at Oxford. The most popular sailing craft used on the Thames are lasers, GP14s, Wayfarers and Enterprises. One sailing boat unique to the Thames is the Thames Rater, which is sailed around Raven's Ait.

Clubs in the Lower Thames (Thames Estuary) include:
 Gravesend Sailing Club in Gravesend, Kent
 Erith Yacht Club near Erith, Kent
 Thurrock Yacht Club in Thurrock
 Island Yacht Club in Canvey Island, Essex
Leigh-On-Sea Sailing Club in Leigh-On-Sea, Essex

Clubs in and near the London section of the Thames include:
 Greenwich Yacht Club in Greenwich
 Docklands Sailing And Watersports Centre at Millwall Dock
 Capital Sailing School at Millwall Dock
 The Ahoy Centre in Deptford 
 The Surrey Docks Watersports Centre at Surrey Quays
 Shadwell Sailing Club at Shadwell Basin
 Little Ship Club near Southwark Bridge
 Royal Thames Yacht Club in Knightsbridge
 South Bank Sailing Club in Putney
 Ranelagh Sailing Club in Putney
 London Corinthian Sailing Club near Hammersmith Bridge
 London Sailing Club in Central London
 Twickenham Yacht Club in Twickenham
 Strand on the Green Sailing Club in Strand on the Green, Chiswick

Clubs on the non-tidal Thames include:
 Tamesis Club in Teddington, London
 Lensbury Sailing Club at The Lensbury in Teddington, London
 Albany Park Canoe & Sailing Centre in Kingston-upon-Thames, London
 Thames Young Mariners in Ham, London
 Minima Yacht Club in Kingston-upon-Thames, London
 Thames Sailing Club in Surbiton, London
 BMYC Riverclub in Thames Ditton, London
 Hampton Sailing Club at Benn's Island in Hampton, London
 Desborough Sailing Club in Shepperton, Surrey
 Aquarius Sailing Club in Lower Sunbury Road in Hampton, London
 Staines Sailing Club in Staines-upon-Thames, Surrey
 Upper Thames Sailing Club in Bourne End, Buckinghamshire
 Goring Thames Sailing Club in Goring-on-Thames, Oxfordshire
 Dorchester Sailing Clubnear Dorchester-on-Thames, in Abingdon, Oxfordshire
 Medley Sailing Club in Oxford, Oxfordshire

See also:
 The Thames Sailing Barge Trust

References

External links
 The association of Thames Yacht Clubs
 The Royal Association of yachting

Sailing in England
Sport on the River Thames